Lia Marika Boysen (born 6 April 1966) is a Swedish actress. She has been married to Anders Ekborg and they have two daughters. In 2006 she received a Guldbagge Award for her role in the film Sök. She has also narrated audiobooks, among them Bedragen (written by Katerina Janouch) and Asyl and Gömda (written by Liza Marklund).

Selected filmography
1988 - Xerxes (TV)
1994 - Yrrol
2000 - The New Country (TV)
2001 - Executive Protection
2002 - Stora teatern (TV)
2003 - De drabbade (TV)
2004 - The Return of the Dancing Master (TV)
2004 - Falla vackert
2005 - Sandor slash Ida
2006 - Möbelhandlarens dotter (TV)
2006 - When Darkness Falls
2007 - Pyramiden
2008 - Les Grandes Personnes
2008 - Gud, lukt och henne
2009 - Olycksfågeln
2010 - Wallander – Dödsängeln
2015 - Returning Home
2016 - The Last King
2017 - Fallet

References

External links

Swedish film actresses
Actresses from Stockholm
1966 births
Living people
Swedish television actresses
Best Supporting Actress Guldbagge Award winners
20th-century Swedish actresses
21st-century Swedish actresses
Swedish people of Danish descent